The Mistake on the Lake or The Mistake by the Lake is a pejorative term referring to:
Cleveland, a city in the U.S. state of Ohio located on the southern shore of Lake Erie
Cleveland Stadium, a former professional sports venue in Cleveland
Erie, Pennsylvania, a city also located on the southern shore of Lake Erie
Exhibition Stadium, a former sports venue in Toronto, Ontario, Canada, on the northern shore of Lake Ontario
New Soldier Field, a professional sports venue in Chicago, Illinois, U.S.
The Lakeside Center portion of McCormick Place, a convention center in Chicago, Illinois, U.S.